This is a list of acts of the Parliament of South Africa enacted in the years 1940 to 1949.

South African acts are uniquely identified by the year of passage and an act number within that year. Some acts have gone by more than one short title in the course of their existence; in such cases each title is listed with the years in which it applied.

1940

1941

1942

1943

1944

1945

1946

1947

1948

1949

References
 Government Gazette of the Union of South Africa, Volumes CXIX–CLVII.
 

1940